Robert Vincent "Bob" Wortman (December 3, 1927 – October 20, 2015) was a collegiate athlete at the University of Findlay, Ohio, where he played basketball and football.  He went on to be a field judge in the American Football League from 1965 through 1969, and in the NFL starting in 1970 through 1992.  He was also an NCAA college basketball referee, and the first person to officiate both in a Super Bowl (VI, 1972) and an NCAA Championship game (1976). He also officiated in Super Bowl XII. He wore number 84 for most of his Professional Football career.

See also

 List of American Football League officials

References

People from Findlay, Ohio
American Football League officials
College men's basketball referees in the United States
National Football League officials
Findlay Oilers football players
Findlay Oilers men's basketball players
1927 births
2015 deaths
American men's basketball players